The Honoris Crux Silver (Silver Cross of Honour), post-nominal letters HCS, is a military decoration for bravery which was instituted by the Republic of South Africa on 1 July 1975. It was awarded to members of the South African Defence Force for exceptional acts of bravery while in great danger. The Honoris Crux Silver was the third most senior in a set of four classes of Honoris Crux decorations, which together replaced the discontinued Honoris Crux of 1952.

The South African military
The Union Defence Forces (UDF) were established in 1912 and renamed the South African Defence Force (SADF) in 1958. On 27 April 1994, it was integrated with six other independent forces into the South African National Defence Force (SANDF).

Institution
The Honoris Crux Silver (Silver Cross of Honour), post-nominal letters HCS, was instituted by the State President on 1 July 1975.

Award criteria
The decoration was awarded to members of the South African Defence Force for exceptional acts of bravery in action, while in great danger. A Bar could be awarded for a further similar deed of bravery. It was the third most senior of a set of four classes of Honoris Crux decorations, the Honoris Crux Diamond, Honoris Crux Gold, Honoris Crux Silver and Honoris Crux, which replaced the discontinued Honoris Crux of 1952.

Order of wear

The position of the Honoris Crux Silver in the official order of precedence was revised twice after 1975, to accommodate the inclusion or institution of new decorations and medals, first with the integration into the South African National Defence Force in 1994 and again with the institution of a new set of awards in 2003, but it remained unchanged on both occasions.
  
Official SANDF order of precedence
 Preceded by the Honoris Crux (1952) (HC) of the Republic of South Africa.
 Succeeded by the Van Riebeeck Decoration (DVR) of the Republic of South Africa.

Official national order of precedence
 Preceded by the Honoris Crux (1952) (HC) of the Republic of South Africa.
 Succeeded by the Van Riebeeck Decoration (DVR) of the Republic of South Africa.

Description
Obverse
The Honoris Crux Silver is a silver Maltese cross which fits in a circle 45 millimetres in diameter, with two swords in saltire surmounted by a circular protea wreath, the arms of the cross in green enamel, with a roundel in the centre, tierced horizontally in the orange, white and blue bands of the national flag, framed in a double silver circle containing 24 stones. It is identical to the Honoris Crux of 1975 in all respects, except the colour of the enamel on the arms of the cross.

Reverse
The reverse has the pre-1994 South African Coat of Arms, with the decoration number impressed above and the silver hallmark below.

Bar
The bar is of silver, with a miniature replica of the Maltese cross embossed in the centre.

Ribbon
The ribbon is 32 millimetres wide and orange, with two 1 millimetre wide white bands in the centre, spaced 4 millimetres apart.

Discontinuation
Conferment of the decoration was discontinued in respect of services performed on or after 27 April 2003, when the Honoris Crux Silver was replaced by the new Nkwe ya Selefera (NS).

Recipients
In respect of those recipients about whom it is available, the actions they were cited for follow below the table.

Note 1:  denotes a posthumous award.

Actions cited for

References

Military decorations and medals of South Africa
Courage awards
1975 establishments in South Africa
Awards established in 1975